The Glorious Adventure is a 1922 British Prizmacolor silent feature film directed by J. Stuart Blackton and written by Felix Orman. The film's sets were designed by Walter Murton. It was shot at the Cricklewood Studios of Stoll Pictures in London.

Plot
As described in a film magazine, Hugh Argyle, a lad of about 14 years, leaves home and bids goodbye to his sweetheart, the Lady Beatrice Fair, and promises to treasure the locket she has given him. Years later he returns after being notified that he is heir to vast estates and a title. He sends word of his coming to Lady Beatrice, now a young woman.

On the boat, Walter Roderick plans to have Hugh killed and to take his place himself. His henchman Bulfinch stabs Hugh and throws him overboard. Roderick then betrays his hireling and Bulfinch is taken to England in chains, vowing revenge on Roderick.

The Lady Beatrice is forced to entertain King Charles II of England, who takes a fancy to her. Nell Gwyn, who is one of the guests, is a bit rough and engages in rude pranks whenever the occasion arises.

Roderick, believing Hugh dead, claims his estates, being aided by a rascally solicitor. He bows to Lady Beatrice, who cannot believe that this man is really Hugh. Forced to journey to London, Lady Beatrice stops at an inn where Roderick is staying. Hugh turns up and not only puts up an excellent fight with Roderick, but with half a dozen blades. Lady Beatrice falls in love with him, but, for some unknown reason, Hugh does not make known his identity.

After much plotting and counter-plotting, Hugh is in London to marry Lady Beatrice when he encounters Roderick and is made his prisoner. She, fearing imprisonment for her debt, marries Bulfinch, who is condemned to die on the marrow. The Great Fire of London (1666) breaks out, and Bulfinch escapes and seeks the Lady Beatrice. He carries her all over London, through flames and over debris, looking for a safe place. Hugh appears and they are trapped until Bulfinch saves them, claiming Lady Beatrice as a bride. Just as it appears to be the darkest for the two lovers, Mrs. Bullfinch and several children appear, and he leaves with his family.

Cast

 Diana Manners as Lady Beatrice Fair 
 Gerald Lawrence as Hugh Argyle 
 Cecil Humphreys as Walter Roderick 
 Victor McLaglen as Bulfinch 
 Alice Crawford as Stephanie Dangerfield 
 Lois Sturt as Nell Gwyn
 William Luff as King Charles II
 Fred E. Wright as Humpty
 Flora le Breton as Rosemary 
 Lennox Pawle as Samuel Pepys
 Haidee Wright as Mrs. Bullfinch 
 Rudolph De Cordova as Thomas Unwin 
 Lawford Davidson as Lord Fitzroy 
 Rosalie Heath as Catherine of Braganza
 Gertrude Sterroll as Duchess Constance of Moreland 
 Tom Coventry as Leclerc 
 Jeff Barlow as The King's chief valet 
 John Marlborough East as The King's major domo 
 Lettice Fairfax as Court Lady (uncredited)
 Hetta Bartlett as Court Lady (uncredited)

Production background
The film was made entirely in Prizmacolor, and starred Lady Diana Manners, Gerald Lawrence, Cecil Humphreys, and Victor McLaglen. It was released by United Artists. Alma Reville, later married to Alfred Hitchcock, may have co-written the script as well as acting as "script girl".

Neither this film, nor the 1918 film of the same name produced by Samuel Goldwyn, is related to the famous book The Glorious Adventure (1927) by Richard Halliburton.

Preservation status
A copy of The Glorious Adventure exists, with a preview available on YouTube:

See also
List of early color feature films

References

Bibliography
Anthony Slide. A Special Relationship: Britain Comes to Hollywood and Hollywood Comes to Britain. University Press of Mississippi, 2015.

External links

1922 films
1920s color films
British historical drama films
British silent feature films
1920s historical drama films
Films directed by J. Stuart Blackton
Films set in England
Films set in London
Films set in the 1660s
Silent films in color
Films shot at Cricklewood Studios
1922 drama films
Early color films
Cultural depictions of Charles II of England
Cultural depictions of Nell Gwyn
Cultural depictions of Catherine of Braganza
1920s British films
Silent drama films
1920s English-language films